The Horseshoe Scout Reservation is a Boy Scouts of America camp, owned by the Chester County Council, and located on the Mason-Dixon line separating Pennsylvania and Maryland.  The name of the camp derives from the Octoraro Creek, a tributary of the Susquehanna River, that makes a meandering 4-mile horseshoe through the property.

The Horseshoe Scout Reservation is divided into two camps:  Camp Horseshoe (in Rising Sun, Maryland), a Boy Scout-only camp, and Camp John H. Ware, III (in Fulton Township, Lancaster County, Pennsylvania). Before 1985 as Campe Ware was known as Camp Jubilee, which was first opened in the 1950s as an Explorer base.

The Reservation is a "multi-use" facility and hosts Boy Scout, Cub Scout, Venturing and other programs, including a Disabled Scout camporee, every year since 1994.  In 2004, Camp Ware opened its "Cub Town," allowing barrack-style sleeping accommodations to Cub Scouts, while several "Webelos sites" allowed 4th and 5th graders to sleep on platform tents similar to those found on most of the tent sites at both Camps Horseshoe and Ware. National Youth Leadership Training (NYLT), Wood Badge and Powder Horn are some of the adult and Scout youth leadership training courses are held at Camp Ware during the off-season period.

History
The Horseshoe Scout Reservation opened for the first camp season in 1928 under the leadership of Charles M. "Chief" Heistand. Chester County Council purchased the property from the Reynolds Family, who occupied the land since the late 18th century. At the time, the property was haven for moonshiners operating illegal stills. When officials from the council first visited, it is said that the moonshiners fled the camp, having mistaken their uniforms and campaign hats for those worn by Pennsylvania State Troopers.

Visitors to the camp can see stones marking off the Mason-Dixon line.

Facilities

Upon purchasing the property, the members of the council built three buildings: Browning Lodge on the old carriage shed foundation, the Allen Memorial Dining Hall (since expanded), and on the foundation of the old barn, the Kindness Center, a building built with funding from the ASPCA to remind the Scouts not to be cruel to animals.  Other original facilities include an Olympic-size swimming pool (the largest pool east of the Mississippi River at the time), the Reynolds Family farmhouse (known as the "White House"), and five "stockade" sites:  Sherwood Forest, Boonesboro (named for Daniel Boone), Kit Carson, Davy Crockett, and Bayard Taylor.

Since then, the camp has expanded to include the following sites:  Octoraro, Timberline, (Harold) Schramm, (Col. Clifton) Lisle, Dan Beard, (Gilbert) Rothrock, and Owen J. Roberts.  Five of the sites; Octoraro, Timberline, Schramm, Lenni Lenape, and Dan Beard, are tent sites, while Rothrock and Roberts have Adirondack shelters.  Lisle, originally a tent site, was converted to a site with large pavilions.

Other buildings at Camp Horseshoe include the Morrison Health Lodge (rebuilt in 2003), the Mahlon Rossiter Visitors Center, which is the Camp's headquarters, the Octoraro Memorial Lodge, which is the Order of the Arrow lodge for the Chester County Council, Schramm Lodge, McIlvain Lodge, Roberts Lodge (Horseshoe's Nature Lodge during summer camp), and Rothrock lodge.  The camp's rifle range is located near Rothrock lodge, adjacent to the camp road, while the archery range is near the swimming pool, and an original Mason-Dixon stone marker.

The site for the "Trailblazer" program is located adjacent to the parking lot and Campcraft. This program is a first year camper program started by Tom Hillhouse that combines fun activities in every program area of camp with skill development for First Class rank. The Challenging Outdoor Personal Experience (COPE) course is located near flag-pole hill and the chapel, adjacent to the main camp road, which was built in the late 1970s that replaced a road that was partially destroyed by Hurricane Agnes.  Newer additions to the camp facilities include a new Scout shower house, William R. Hess Trading Post (called Trader Bill's), and a renovated Parade Field.

Program

Retreat Ceremony
This daily observance has changed little since the first season over 80 years ago.  Scouts and leaders attend in full uniform. Scouts form as a troop, stand retreat, and pass in review.  Leaders stand on the review line with the staff.
Troops are judged on their marching skills and uniform appearance with a trophy awarded to the winner each evening.  The judges consider if the troop is in step with a full stride, holds its ranks, executes a right column and two right flanks properly, and wears a complete Scout uniform.

Saturday Night Campfire
A special closing campfire is held at "Achgeketum" circle. Named for G. Ernest Heegard's vigil honor name, the camp's director for 29 years. Achgeketum is the Lenni Lenape word for "teacher".  The entire camp assembles at the entrance to Sherwood Forest and follows a switchback trail to the circle.  Following camp traditions, all Scouts who are attending Horseshoe for the first time are seated in the seats farthest from the fire while older Scouts enter through the "Skull Gate" and are seated closer to the fire.  The center and outer fires are ceremoniously lighted and Order of the Arrow pageant follows. Next, the Camp Director serves as the master of ceremonies awarding the Horseshoe patch and year segment to Scouts in order of the number of years they have attended a week of camp.  After Scout leaders are presented their patch and segment, they remain in the circle to present the "Silver Buckle,"
The Silver Buckle is awarded to one youth member from each troop who, in the opinion of his fellow Scouts, has above all others, demonstrated the finest example of Scout Spirit, the Scout Oath, and the Scout Law in his conduct throughout the week.  The Scout selected must be from a troop of at least eight members, been in camp all week, be under the age of eighteen, and never have received the award before. The Saturday Night Campfire closes with the staff singing the Horseshoe song.

Camp John H. Ware, III

Camp John H. Ware, III is a Boy Scout and Cub Scout summer, winter, and weekend camp located in Peach Bottom, Pennsylvania, on the Horseshoe Scout Reservation. It is organized by Boy Scouts of America. It shares the reservation with Camp Horseshoe, located on the other side of the Octoraro River. The camp, formerly known as Camp Jubilee, offers a wide variety of activities for youth to participate in while earning merit badges and advancing in rank.

The camp offers its accommodations in all seasons, however it is not staffed throughout the year. The only time when a full complement of staff is present is summer camp. During the winter camping season, the rangers staff the Trading Post, offering food and small souvenirs, including T-shirts and other supplies.

Summer camp
This is the most popular time at Camp Ware. Many weeks the camp is filled up to full capacity (250 persons, not including staff), and every area of the camp is open for use. This is when Scouts have the opportunity to earn merit badges toward their next rank, and the staff act as instructors and councilors to help them complete the requirements. The pool, while offering merit badges such as Swimming and Lifesaving, also serves as a recreational area for Scouts when they are not working on another merit badge, or during scheduled free swims for each troop. Scouts are encouraged to use the pool often as temperatures can be in excess of 100 °F. However, when it does reach these extreme temperatures, water coolers are set up at each area and everyone is required to drink plenty of water arriving and leaving (even at the pool). Troops staying during summer camp have eight campsites to choose from: Hawkeye, Pathfinder, Deerslayer, Mohican, Jubilee, Leatherstocking, Oswego and Trapper (the largest). The sleeping quarters consist of A-frame "butterfly" tents, with two Scouts or adults per tent. In the off season, the tarps that cover the tents are stored until next year, as are the metal cots.

Winter camp
Winter Camp is usually not used for merit badges so much as bonding trips for troops who attend. Snowball fights are not uncommon in the parade field, and sledding is encouraged on the hill beside the rifle range. Usually troops make use of Macaleer Lodge (affectionately referred to by most as Cubtown, or the Red Roof Inn) during this time, because of its heating system and indoor facilities.

Camp Site Areas
Camp Horseshoe:

Rothrock:

Rothrock is an Adirondacks and Tent Site. It features many Adirondacks and many tent platforms. Rothrock is located next to Rothrock Lodge and the new Female Showerhouse. Rothrock is also very close to the parking lot and to the Rifle Range.

Roberts:

Roberts is an Adirondacks and Tent Site. Roberts is located right next to Rothrock is next to Robert’s Lodge (Used as Nature during Camp) and McIlvaine Lodge. 

Sherwood (Forest) 

Sherwood is a Stockade site located right next to the Parking Lot, Sherwood is commonly known as one of the nicest and most convenient site to get to, which is located right next to the Parking Lot and Trailblazers.

Boonesboro:

Boonesboro is a Stockade site and is located next to Campcraft and The Old Qonset Hut. 

Schramm:

Schramm is a tent site located at the beginning of the Stockade Trail, Schramm was recently expanded into the old Richardson Campsite.

Richardson (Previous Site)

Richardson was located right next to Schramm on the Stockade Trail and was a small tent site, but was recently made into a part of Schramm.

(Kit) Carson

Carson is a Stockade site located on the Stockade Trail, Carson is a very nice site and is also known as a very nice site.

(Davy) Crockett

Crockett is a Stockade Site near the end of the Stockade Trail and on the Lisle Vehicle Path. 

(Bayard) Taylor

Taylor is located at the End of the Stockade Trail and is a Stockade Site. Taylor also has a beach nearby named Taylor Beach.

(Clifton) Lisle

Lisle is at the End of the Stockade Trail and is a stockade site. Lisle is known to be the nicest site in camp as it features large pavilion like stockades and a Pavilion for Hammocks.

Lenni Lenape:

Commonly known as Lenni, Lenni Lenape is a tent site with 1 Adirondack. Lenni Lenape is located near the end of the Stockade Trail.

Conestoga: Conestoga is a Tent site that features 1 Adirondack and is located near the top of the Stockade Trail.

Dan Beard:

Dan Beard is the largest Tent Site in camp, and is located right next to the Shower House and the Old Qonset Hut.

Timberline:

Timberline is located near the OA Lodge and the Dining Hall, Timberline is a Tent site which has 2 Adirondacks. 

Octoraro: Octoraro is located right next to Timberline, the quickest way to get in is through Timberline, Octoraro is a Tent Site which has 1 Adirondack. Octoraro is located right next to the Pool.

Camp Ware:

Staff City: A few cabins located near the parking lot which house upper staff members including most of the Directors. Also used for staff at NYLT.

Jubilee: Closest to The Trading Post, Health Lodge and Dining Hall, Jubilee is a large site which features tent platforms and Adirondacks. It is also one of the few sites with power, so it usually holds anyone with a disability.

Hawkeye: Hawkeye is located right next to the Swimming Pool, and right next to Jubilee. Hawkeye is similar to Jubilee, but only has tent platforms unlike Jubilee.

Pathfinder: Pathfinder is one of the farthest sights away from most areas, located near the Pool and very close to Mohican, pathfinder only has tent platforms.

Mohican: Mohican is the farthest site away from the main camp, Mohican is a large site with two main tent platform areas, it is located in between Leatherstocking and Pathfinder. Mohican also shares Bathrooms and a pavilion with Leatherstocking.

Leatherstocking: Leatherstocking is located right next to Mohican and also has two major areas for Troops/Packs to stay. Leatherstocking only has Tent Platforms, and also shares a Bathroom and Pavilion with Mohican.

Trapper:
Trapper is located right next to the Handicraft Area and the Foard Pavilion. Trapper is a large site, it has a pavilion and many tent platforms and in multiple areas.

Deerslayer: Deerslayer is located right next to the Parade Field and next to Oswego. Deerslayer has a pavilion and tent platforms.

Oswego: The newest of the Sites, Oswego was originally a clearing, but around 2013-2014, extra tent platforms were put in Oswego and it was used as a site for smaller Troops/Packs. Most of the infrastructure in Oswego was built by Pack 54.

Music

References

External links

Local council camps of the Boy Scouts of America
Buildings and structures in Chester County, Pennsylvania
Summer camps in Pennsylvania
1928 establishments in Pennsylvania